Robert Sampson (March 4, 1925 – December 3, 2006) was a vice president at United Airlines. He was diagnosed with muscular dystrophy at age 5, and used a wheelchair for most of his life.

Sampson, a lawyer, was an advocate for disabled persons. He served the President's Commission on Employment of the Handicapped under five American presidents. His efforts helped lead to architectural improvements in access for the disabled, such as wheelchair ramps.

Sampson partnered with Jerry Lewis to raise money for the treatment of muscular dystrophy.

A Boeing 747-400, tail number N116UA, is named after him.

References

1925 births
2006 deaths
20th-century American lawyers
Deaths from muscular dystrophy
People from Evanston, Illinois